Chaux-des-Crotenay is a commune in the Jura department in Bourgogne-Franche-Comté in eastern France.

Population

Battle of Alesia

The siege of Alesia was the last major battle between the Gauls under Vercingetorix and the Romans under Julius Caesar, but the location of the historical city of Alesia remains under dispute.  The generally accepted location is in Alise-Sainte-Reine, but Danielle Porte, a professor at the Sorbonne, has argued for an alternative theory that a site in Chaux-des-Crotenay better fits the historical description.

See also
Communes of the Jura department

References

External links
Alesia, the Jura Hypothesis

Communes of Jura (department)